Okaerinasai (おかえりなさい) is a Japanese greeting on returning home.

Music

Albums
Okaerinasai (album), album by Miyuki Nakajima 1979
Okaerinasai, album by Cousin

Songs
"Okaerinasai" (ja), single by Kikuko Inoue 1994
"Okaerinasai" (ja) - Maaya Sakamoto 2011
"Okaerinasai" (song), single by Jun Shibata 2005 
"Okaerinasai", single by Chiyoko Shimakura 
"Okaerinasai", single by duo Humbert Humbert
"Okaerinasai", single by Funky Monkey Babys
"Okaerinasai", single by Le Couple 
"Okaerinasai", single by Kumiko (singer)

Other
Okaerinasaai! (ja), programme by Fukui Television Broadcasting